Bad Georgia Road is a 1977 American action comedy film produced, co-written and directed by John C. Broderick and starring Gary Lockwood, Carol Lynley and Royal Dano.

Synopsis 
A New York City woman inherits a moonshine farm in the South.

Cast 
Gary Lockwood - Leroy Hastings 
Carol Lynley - Molly Golden 
Royal Dano - Arthur Pennyrich 
John Wheeler - Dub Douchette 
John Kerry - Larch  
Cliff Emmich - Earl DePue 
Tom Kibbe - Darryl 
Glynn Rubin - Laura Jean

References

External links 
 
 
 

1977 films
1970s action comedy films
American action comedy films
1977 comedy films
Dimension Pictures films
1970s English-language films
1970s American films